Andrew Michael Hurley (born 1975) is a British writer whose debut novel, The Loney, was published in a limited edition of 350 copies on 1 October 2014 by Tartarus Press and was published under Hodder and Stoughton's John Murray imprint in 2015.  He was interviewed on BBC Radio 4's Open Book programme "British Gothic" in October 2015.

The Loney has been reviewed in The Guardian and The Telegraph. It is set in the area of Morecambe Bay in north west England, described in the text as "that strange nowhere between the Wyre and the Lune". Hurley has said that the novel's two starting points were "to write a kind of dark version of the Nativity [...] and exploring ideas of faith and belief" and "various wild, lonely places on the north west coast of Lancashire [...] a sense of imminent menace or dormant power lying just under the sand and the water". It is the winner of the 2015 Costa Book Awards First Novel Award as well as the British Book Industry award for best debut fiction and book of the year.

Hurley has previously had two volumes of short stories published by the Lime Tree Press (Cages and Other Stories, 2006, and  The Unusual Death of Julie Christie and Other Stories, 2008). He lives in Lancashire, where he teaches English literature and creative writing.

His second novel, Devil's Day, was published on 19 October 2017 by John Murray and Tartarus Press Its setting, "The Endlands", is based on Langden valley in Lancashire's Forest of Bowland. The book "deploys myth, landscape and the tropes of horror to chilling effect". Hurley was joint winner of the Royal Society of Literature's 2018 Encore Award for the best second novel.

Hurley's third novel Starve Acre was published 31 October 2019 by John Murray. Film rights had been bought by House Productions. The "Starve Acre" of the title is the home of a couple whose child has died, and it is "a novel which grapples with the irrationality and complexity of grief, the power and potency of folklore, and a moving examination of the effect a child's loss can have on its parents". The Guardian'''s critic described it as "an atmospheric tale in the same tradition of English folk-horror" as his previous two books.

References

External links
  Includes questions and answers, with a link to an extract from "The Loney"''

1975 births
Living people
English horror writers
Place of birth missing (living people)
Date of birth missing (living people)